Below are the squads for the men's football tournament at the 2006 Asian Games, played in Doha, Qatar.

Bahrain
Coach:  Senad Kreso

Bangladesh
Coach: Hasanuzzaman Khan Bablu

China
Coach:  Ratomir Dujković

Hong Kong
Coach: Lai Sun Cheung

India
Coach:  Bob Houghton

Indonesia
Coach:  Foppe de Haan

Iran
Coach:  René Simões

Iraq
Coach: Yahya Alwan

Japan
Coach: Yasuharu Sorimachi

Jordan
Coach: Nihad Al-Souqar

Kuwait
Coach:  Vladimir Petrović

Kyrgyzstan
Coach: Boris Podkorytov

Macau
Coach:  Masanaga Kageyama

Malaysia
Coach: Norizan Bakar

Maldives
Coach:  Yordan Stoykov

North Korea
Coach: Ri Jong-man

Oman
Coach:  Milan Máčala

Pakistan
Coach:  Salman Sharida

Palestine
Coach: Ghassan Al-Balawi

Qatar
Coach:  Džemaludin Mušović

Singapore
Coach:  Radojko Avramović

South Korea
Coach:  Pim Verbeek

Syria
Coach: Fajr Ibrahim

Tajikistan
Coach: Karim Toshpulodov

Thailand
Coach: Charnwit Polcheewin

United Arab Emirates
Coach:  Alex Dupont

Uzbekistan
Coach: Rauf Inileev

Vietnam
Coach:  Alfred Riedl

References
Rosters

External links
Official website

2006
squads